Kolonádový most (literally The Colonnade Bridge) is a bridge over the Váh river in Piešťany. It connects the town to the Spa Island.

The bridge was designed by architect Emil Belluš in 1930–33, in Streamline Moderne, an international style of Art Deco architecture that emerged in the 1930s. The center of the bridge features glass engravings by a well-known artist Martin Benka titled "Detva Songs" and "At Sheepcote". The western entrance of the bridge features an inscription in Classical Latin: "Saluberrimae Pistinienses Thermae" (The healing Piešťany Spa) and the eastern entrance features the spa's motto "Surge et ambula" (Get up and walk). The "Crutch Breaker" statue and the symbol of the spa, stands at the western entrance. The sculpture is the work of the Academic Sculptor Robert Kuhmayer (created in 1934). The bridge was destroyed in 1945 by retreating German army and it was reconstructed in 1956.

Bridges in Slovakia
Bridges completed in 1933
20th-century architecture in Slovakia
Modernist architecture in Slovakia